The Wills Wing Talon is an American high-wing, single-place, hang glider that was designed and produced by Wills Wing of Santa Ana, California in the early 2000s. Now out of production, when it was available the aircraft was supplied complete and ready-to-fly.

Design and development
The Talon was designed as competition-level glider. It is made from aluminum tubing, with the double-surface wing covered in Dacron sailcloth. Its wing is a topless design, lacking upper rigging and the supporting king post. The nose angle is 132°.

The models are each named for their wing area in square feet.

Operational history
The Talon series placed highly in the 2002 competition season.

Variants
Talon 140
Small-sized model for lighter pilots. The glider model is HGMA certified.
Talon 150
Mid-sized model for medium-weight pilots. The glider model is HGMA certified.
Talon 160
Large-sized model for heavier pilots.
Talon 2002 140
Small-sized model for lighter pilots. The glider model is HGMA certified.
Talon 2002 150
Mid-sized model for medium-weight pilots. The glider model is HGMA certified.

Specifications (Talon 140)

References

External links
Photo of a Talon in flight

Talon
Hang gliders